Helmuth Kahl (17 February 1901 – 23 January 1974) was a German modern pentathlete. He won a bronze medal at the 1928 Summer Olympics.

References

1901 births
1974 deaths
German male modern pentathletes
Olympic modern pentathletes of Germany
Modern pentathletes at the 1928 Summer Olympics
Olympic bronze medalists for Germany
Olympic medalists in modern pentathlon
Sportspeople from Berlin
Medalists at the 1928 Summer Olympics